United Nations Security Council Resolution 81, adopted on March 24, 1950, having a communication from the Secretary General the Council took note of General Assembly Resolution 268 and decided to base its action upon the principles contained therein, should an appropriate occasion arise.

The resolution was adopted with 10 votes; the Soviet Union was absent when voting took place.

See also
List of United Nations Security Council Resolutions 1 to 100 (1946–1953)

References
Text of the Resolution at undocs.org
Text of General Assembly Resolution 268 (PDF)

External links
 

 0081
March 1950 events